HTO Park (stylized as HTO) is an urban beach in Toronto, Ontario, Canada, that opened in 2007.  It is located west of Harbourfront Centre, on Lake Ontario.

History

The park is built on quays once used by ships berthing in Toronto's Inner Harbour.

The park consists of two sections:

 HTO  Park West is built on the eastern half of Maple Leaf Quay
 HTO  Park East is built on the old Peter Street Slip

The two quays are concrete man-made infill during the 1920s with the project completed by 1929. The eastern portion was home to Maple Leaf Mills Silos until 1983. The western half was home to a smaller industrial business with a small office structure. During the 1980s, a condo project (now known as Harbour Terrace) was built on part of Maple Leaf Quay while the rest stood empty as a parking lot. The eastern portion lay empty in the 1980s and 1990s.

Name

Design
HTO Park was designed by landscape architecture firm Janet Rosenberg & Studio, Claude Cormier Architectes Paysagistes Inc. and Hariri Pontarini Architects. The park incorporates elements of a park, beach, and golf course. The park's standout feature is a sandpit that holds Muskoka chairs and enormous fixed yellow metal umbrellas. The umbrellas were designed to evoke the Georges Seurat painting A Sunday Afternoon on the Island of La Grande Jatte. At night, the park knolls are illuminated by LED lights.

Area
HTO Park East is also home the Toronto Fire Services Station (Marine Unit) 334 (built 2000), Toronto EMS Station 36.

See also
 List of Toronto parks
Other beaches and waterfront parks:
 Cherry Beach
 Sugar Beach
 The Beaches

References

External links

 Harbourfront Parks and Open Space

Parks in Toronto
Harbourfront, Toronto
Urban beaches
Beaches of Toronto
Waterfront Toronto
Outdoor structures in Canada